Patryk Dziczek (born 25 February 1998) is a Polish professional footballer who plays as a midfielder for Piast Gliwice. Besides Poland, he has played in Italy.

Club career

Lazio
On 23 August 2019, he signed with the Italian club Lazio.

Loan to Salernitana
On 28 August 2019, he was loaned to Salernitana in Serie B.

Return to Piast Gliwice
On 31 August 2022, Dziczek returned to Piast Gliwice and signed a three-year contract.

Honours

Club
Piast Gliwice
Ekstraklasa: 2018–19

Individual
Ekstraklasa Young Player of the Season: 2018–19

References

External links
 
 

1998 births
Sportspeople from Gliwice
Living people
Association football midfielders
Polish footballers
Poland youth international footballers
Poland under-21 international footballers
Piast Gliwice players
S.S. Lazio players
U.S. Salernitana 1919 players
III liga players
Ekstraklasa players
Serie B players
Polish expatriate footballers
Expatriate footballers in Italy
Polish expatriate sportspeople in Italy